Svetilki is a rural locality (a village) in Staroselskoye Rural Settlement, Vologodsky District, Vologda Oblast, Russia. The population was 23 as of 2002. There are 2 streets.

Geography 
Svetilki is located 46 km west of Vologda (the district's administrative centre) by road. Besednoye is the nearest rural locality.

References 

Rural localities in Vologodsky District